Mohawk Vista is a census-designated place in Plumas County, California, United States. The population was 159 at the 2010 census, up from 121 at the 2000 census.

Geography
Mohawk Vista is located at  (39.781650, -120.580343).

Demographics

2010
At the 2010 census Mohawk Vista had a population of 159. The population density was 13.3 people per square mile (5.1/km). The racial makeup of Mohawk Vista was 146 (91.8%) White, 0 (0.0%) African American, 1 (0.6%) Native American, 7 (4.4%) Asian, 0 (0.0%) Pacific Islander, 1 (0.6%) from other races, and 4 (2.5%) from two or more races.  Hispanic or Latino of any race were 4 people (2.5%).

The whole population lived in households, no one lived in non-institutionalized group quarters and no one was institutionalized.

There were 74 households, 9 (12.2%) had children under the age of 18 living in them, 42 (56.8%) were opposite-sex married couples living together, 2 (2.7%) had a female householder with no husband present, 4 (5.4%) had a male householder with no wife present.  There were 7 (9.5%) unmarried opposite-sex partnerships, and 0 (0%) same-sex married couples or partnerships. 19 households (25.7%) were one person and 10 (13.5%) had someone living alone who was 65 or older. The average household size was 2.15.  There were 48 families (64.9% of households); the average family size was 2.48.

The age distribution was 16 people (10.1%) under the age of 18, 9 people (5.7%) aged 18 to 24, 18 people (11.3%) aged 25 to 44, 65 people (40.9%) aged 45 to 64, and 51 people (32.1%) who were 65 or older.  The median age was 59.3 years. For every 100 females, there were 96.3 males.  For every 100 females age 18 and over, there were 104.3 males.

There were 102 housing units at an average density of 8.5 per square mile, of the occupied units 62 (83.8%) were owner-occupied and 12 (16.2%) were rented. The homeowner vacancy rate was 3.1%; the rental vacancy rate was 14.3%.  138 people (86.8% of the population) lived in owner-occupied housing units and 21 people (13.2%) lived in rental housing units.

2000
At the 2000 census there were 121 people, 55 households, and 36 families in the CDP. The population density was 10.2 people per square mile (3.9/km). There were 88 housing units at an average density of 7.4 per square mile (2.9/km).  The racial makeup of the CDP was 98.35% White and 1.65% Native American. Hispanic or Latino of any race were 0.83%.

Of the 55 households 18.2% had children under the age of 18 living with them, 56.4% were married couples living together, 7.3% had a female householder with no husband present, and 34.5% were non-families. 32.7% of households were one person and 5.5% were one person aged 65 or older. The average household size was 2.20 and the average family size was 2.72.

The age distribution was 18.2% under the age of 18, 7.4% from 18 to 24, 16.5% from 25 to 44, 45.5% from 45 to 64, and 12.4% 65 or older. The median age was 49 years. For every 100 females, there were 105.1 males. For every 100 females age 18 and over, there were 106.3 males.

The median household income was $40,893 and the median family income  was $55,833. Males had a median income of $31,750 versus $30,714 for females. The per capita income for the CDP was $20,172. None of the population and none of the families were below the poverty line.

Politics

References

Census-designated places in Plumas County, California
Census-designated places in California